Chthonocephalus is a genus of annual herbs in the family Asteraceae. The genus is endemic to Australia, with species occurring in all mainland states.
 
 Species

References

External links
 

Asteraceae genera
Asterales of Australia
Gnaphalieae